Norra Tornen (in English, Northern Towers) are a pair of high-rise apartment buildings located in Vasastaden district of Stockholm, Sweden. The complex contains 300 residential units and ground breaking took place in the autumn of 2015.

History
In 2009, the Stockholm City planning office called for the construction of two skyscrapers in a new residential area on the border between Stockholm and Solna, a planning area later named Hagastaden. These  twin towers were called "" in the original zoning plan, after the Torsplan plaza on which they were meant to be built. The general shape and approximate height were decided by City Architect Aleksander Wolodarski. 

Despite being criticised for its height and for being similar to the Embarcadero Center in San Francisco, a Norwegian company was awarded the contract to build the skyscrapers – only to pull out in 2011, citing lack of funds. In 2012, the city invited several companies for a new informal competition for the development rights to the property. Mayor Sten Nordin finally presented the winning proposal in June 2013: A design by the Dutch architectural firm OMA, commissioned by Oscar Properties, scheduled for completion in 2018.

Construction of the towers

References

Buildings and structures in Stockholm
Buildings and structures under construction in Sweden
Skyscrapers in Sweden